"Five of Everything" is a song by the American rock band 311. It waas the first single released from their 11th studio album Stereolithic, on February 4, 2014. The band's vocalist, Nick Hexum, said, "This song rocks. I'm glad we're starting with a rocker."

Reception
Nick Catucci  in Entertainment Weekly wrote that the band's sound "never really changed with the times" and that "Five of Everything" sounded like it could have been on their 311 album.

Music video
On February 19, 2014, a music video for the song was premiered on Yahoo! Music. The video shows the band in the studio playing the song. It was directed by Brian Bowen Smith and edited by B. Love.

References

311 (band) songs
2014 singles
Songs written by Nick Hexum
Songs written by SA Martinez
2014 songs